Fritz Diez (27 February 1901 – 19 October 1979) was a German actor, producer, director and theater manager.

Biography

Early life

Diez's mother was a servant, and raised her three children alone. To support his family, the child began working at the age of nine. While on the 7th grade, he appeared in his class' production of William Tell. In 1920, after joining the Meiningen Ducal Theater in the role of a supernumerary actor, Diez left his work as an electrician's apprentice and began taking acting classes in the Meiningen School of Dramatic Arts. He devoted himself to professional acting ever since, appearing on the stages of theaters in Flensburg, Hanau, Baden-Baden, Würzburg and Eger. While performing in the Eisenach Theater, he met his future wife, actress Martha Beschort. The two married in 1923.

During 1932, while he and Martha were working in the Stadttheater Bremerhaven, they both joined the KPD. Diez, who originally was a member of the Guild of the German Stage, joined the Profintern-oriented Revolutionary Trade Union Opposition and was elected as chairman of the theater's branch.

Exile
On the morning of 28 February 1933, a day after the Reichstag fire, Diez's home was raided by the Gestapo. On 6 March, immediately after the elections, the actor was dismissed from his work for being a communist. During 1935, Diez - fearing an interrogation by the Gestapo - had to emigrate from Germany. He and his wife traveled to Switzerland, where he worked in the St. Gallen Theater. Diez became involved in the communist and anti-fascist circles of German exiles that were formed in the country. The St. Gallen Theater's manager, Theo Modes, was a supporter of the Third Reich, and Diez was "completely isolated" in his place of work. In 1943 he joined the Swiss branch of the recently founded National Committee for a Free Germany. By the end of the war, Diez headed the St. Gallen fraction of the Democratic Union of Germans in Switzerland, an offshoot of the Committee. He also edited this movement's newspaper.

German Democratic Republic

Diez returned to the Soviet-administered Meiningen in 1946.  He worked in the municipal theater, first as an actor and later as a director and an artistic director. In 1947, he was appointed its manager. During 1952, he made his debut on screen in the DEFA film Shadow Over The Islands. He appeared in some twenty films until the end of his career, as well as in several television productions.

In 1954, Diez left Meiningen, remaining an honorable member of the theater, and instead took the position of the Halle National Theater's manager. On 1958 he joined the Dresden Theater as an actor and a director. During the 1960s, he performed and directed plays in the Volksbühne and in the Deutsches Theater. Diez was also a member of the German Shakespeare Society.

The figure of Hitler, which he first portrayed in the Meiningen Theater during 1947, was described by Diez as an "ungrateful role which always seemed to pursue me." He played the character on screen and in television in ten different productions - among them Ernst Thälmann - Führer seiner Klasse (1955), I, Justice, Frozen Flashes (both 1967), Liberation (1970-1), Seventeen Moments of Spring (1973), Take Aim (1974) and Soldiers of Freedom (1977). Dilara Ozerova - the wife of Yuri Ozerov, who directed Liberation - claimed that Diez was reluctant to accept the invitation to depict Hitler in her husband's film series, fearing typecasting, but had to accept it as a "Party mission". Author Charles P. Mitchell wrote that the actor was "Eastern Europe's equivalent to Bobby Watson in terms of the frequency of his Hitler appearances."

In 1971, Diez received the Patriotic Order of Merit in silver. On 9 October 1979, shortly before his death, he was awarded the title of an Honorary Citizen of Meiningen.

Filmography

References

External links
 
Fritz Diez. defa-sternstunden.de.

1901 births
1979 deaths
Artists from Meiningen
People from Saxe-Meiningen
German male stage actors
Communist Party of Germany politicians
Socialist Unity Party of Germany politicians
Exiles from Nazi Germany
Communists in the German Resistance
German theatre directors
German theatre managers and producers
German male film actors
German male television actors
20th-century German male actors
Recipients of the Patriotic Order of Merit in silver